West Rutland is the central village and a census-designated place (CDP) in the town of West Rutland, Rutland County, Vermont, United States. As of the 2020 census, it had a population of 1,898, out of 2,214 in the entire town of West Rutland.

The CDP is in central Rutland County, in the southern part of the town. It sits in a valley on the east side of the Taconic Mountains, drained to the east by the Clarendon River, a tributary of Otter Creek, and to the west by the Castleton River, a tributary of the Poultney River. Both sets of rivers eventually flow to Lake Champlain.

U.S. Route 4, a four-lane expressway, passes south of the village center, with access from Exit 6. Route 4 leads east  to U.S. Route 7 on the south side of Rutland and west  to Fair Haven. Vermont Route 4A, former US 4, is Main Street through West Rutland; it leads east  to downtown Rutland and west  to Castleton. Vermont Route 133 (Clarendon Avenue) leads south from the center of West Rutland  to Middletown Springs.

References 

Populated places in Rutland County, Vermont
Census-designated places in Rutland County, Vermont
Census-designated places in Vermont